Bajubon R Kharlukhi (died 2021) was an Indian politician. He was elected to the Lok Sabha, the lower house of the Parliament of India from the Shillong  constituency of Meghalaya as a member of the All Party Hill Leaders Conference.

References

20th-century births
2021 deaths
Lok Sabha members from Meghalaya
India MPs 1980–1984
People from Shillong
Year of birth missing